= Kurgansky =

Kurgansky (masculine), Kurganskaya (feminine), or Kurganskoye (neuter) may refer to:

- Andriy Kurgansky, chairman of the Ukrainian soccer club FC Metalurh Zaporizhzhya
- Kurgan Oblast (Kurganskaya oblast), a federal subject of Russia
